The American League East is one of Major League Baseball's six divisions. MLB consists of an East, Central, and West division for each of its two 15-team leagues, the American League (AL) and National League (NL). This division was created before the start of the  season along with the American League West division. Before that time, each league consisted of 10 teams without any divisions.

Four of the division's five teams are located in the Eastern United States, with the other team, the Toronto Blue Jays, in Eastern Canada. It is currently the only division that contains a non-American team. At the end of the MLB season, the team with the best record in the division earns one of the AL's six playoff spots.

History
Baseball writers have long posited that the American League East is the toughest division in MLB; during its 50-year existence, an AL East team has gone on to play in the World Series 27 times, and 16 of those teams have been crowned World Series champions. Since the  season, when the wild-card playoff berth was introduced, the AL East has produced 20 of the 31 wild-card teams for the American League (the AL West seven, and the AL Central five).

When MLB split into divisions for the  season, the American League, unlike the National League, split its 12 teams strictly on geography. The six teams located in the Eastern Time Zone were placed in the AL East, and the other six were placed in the AL West.

Realignment of 1972

In September 1971, American League owners approved the move of the second Washington Senators franchise to Arlington, Texas, to become the Texas Rangers. With the Rangers moving to the AL West, the owners then debated whether the Chicago White Sox or Milwaukee Brewers should move to the AL East for 1972. The White Sox requested they be moved to the East, stating they were an original American League franchise and wanted to play more games against other old-line AL teams, five of which were in the East.

The Oakland Athletics objected to moving the White Sox to the East; owner Charlie Finley was a Chicago native who wanted to continue to make three trips per season with his club to Chicago. The Minnesota Twins went a step further and objected to switching either the White Sox or Brewers. The Twins wanted to keep nearby Chicago and Milwaukee as division rivals, citing the National League's lack of geographic accuracy in forming its divisions as a reason why the Rangers should not have been shifted out of the East. The Twins also noted the National Football League's Dallas Cowboys played in the NFC East.

Division membership

Current members
Baltimore Orioles (1969–present), founding member
Boston Red Sox (1969–present), founding member
New York Yankees (1969–present), founding member
Tampa Bay Rays (1998–present), known as the Tampa Bay Devil Rays before 2008
Toronto Blue Jays (1977–present)

Former members
Cleveland Indians (1969–1993), founding member, moved to the AL Central
Detroit Tigers (1969–1997), founding member, moved to the AL Central
Milwaukee Brewers (1972–1993), joined from the AL West, moved to the AL Central (later moved to the NL Central)
Washington Senators (1969–1971), founding member, moved to the AL West as the Texas Rangers

Timeline

 AL East was formed with six teams due to the 1969 expansion, as the AL grew from 10 teams to 12.
 Following the 1971 season, the Washington Senators franchise relocated and became the Texas Rangers of the AL West; the Milwaukee Brewers moved to the AL East to maintain an equal number of teams in each division.
 The Toronto Blue Jays were added in the 1977 expansion, becoming the seventh team of the AL East.
 As part of the 1994 realignment, Cleveland and Milwaukee were moved to the newly created AL Central, reducing the AL East to five teams.
 The Tampa Bay Devil Rays were added in the 1998 expansion while Detroit moved to the AL Central, maintaining the AL East at five teams.
 Entering the 2008 season, Tampa Bay's nicknamed changed from Devil Rays to Rays.

Champions by year

Team names link to the season in which each team played

* – The Yankees and Red Sox finished with exact records, tied for the division championship; the Yankees won a one-game tie-breaker.

 – Due to the 1981 Major League Baseball strike, the season was split. The Yankees won the first half and defeated the second-half champion Brewers (62–45) in the postseason.

 – Due to the 1994–95 Major League Baseball strike starting August 12, the season was not played to completion. The Yankees were leading at the time of the strike.

+ – The Red Sox and Yankees finished tied for first place with identical records. The Yankees were declared division winners, due to having won the season series against the Red Sox, and the Red Sox received the wild card berth.

 – Due to the COVID-19 pandemic, the 2020 season was shortened to 60 games. By virtue of an expanded eight-team postseason format, the division runner-up Yankees also qualified for the playoffs.

AL East statistics

 Former division members
Totals updated through conclusion of the 2022 postseason.

Other postseason teams
Since the advent of the Wild Card, AL East teams have faced each other in the ALCS 5 times, the ALDS 4 times, and the Wild Card twice.

See List of American League Wild Card winners (since 1994)

* – From 2012 to 2019, and in 2021, the Wild Card was expanded to two teams. Those teams faced each other in the Wild Card Game to determine the final participant in the American League Division Series. In 2020 only, eight teams, including the three division winners, played in a best-of-three Wild Card Series, with the winners advancing to the Division Series. Starting in 2022, the Wild Card field was increased to three teams, and along with the lowest-ranked division winner, qualified for the Wild Card Series to determine the remaining two slots in the Division Series.

**  In , the Texas Rangers and the Tampa Bay Rays finished the season with the identical records of 91–71. A one-game playoff was held and the Rays won it 5–2 over the Rangers to capture the second Wild Card berth.

***  In , the Toronto Blue Jays and the Baltimore Orioles finished the season with the identical records of 89–73. However, the Blue Jays won the right to host the Wild Card Game by virtue of their 10–9 regular-season record against the Orioles.

**** Due to the COVID-19 pandemic, the season was shortened to 60 games.

*****  In , the Boston Red Sox and the New York Yankees finished the season with the identical records of 92–70. However, the Red Sox won the right to host the Wild Card Game by virtue of their 10–9 regular-season record against the Yankees.

Beginning in 2022, the postseason has expanded to three division leaders and three wild cards per league.

Season results

Notes and Tiebreakers
 New York and Boston were tied for the division championship and played in a tie-breaker game. The Yankees won 5–4 to claim the division crown.
 New York and Boston were tied for the division championship and wild-card berth, but the Yankees claimed the division crown by winning the season series 10–9, relegating Boston to the wild-card spot. New York and Los Angeles Angels of the American League West were also tied for the second and third seed, but the Yankees were relegated to the third seed by losing the season series 6–4.
 Boston and Cleveland of the American League Central were tied for the first and second seed, but the Red Sox claimed the top overall seed by winning the season series 5–2, relegating Cleveland to the second seed.
 Tampa Bay and Texas of the American League West were tied for the second wild-card berth and played in a tie-breaker game. The Rays won 5–2 to claim the second wild-card spot.
 Toronto and Baltimore were tied for both wild-card berths, but the Blue Jays claimed the first wild-card spot by winning the season series 10–9, relegating Baltimore to the second wild-card spot.
 Boston and New York both finished with identical 92-70 records, but the Red Sox claimed the first wild-card spot by winning the season series 10–9, relegating the Yankees to the second wild-card spot.

Notes

References

External links
MLB Final Standings By Year at shrpsports.com

Major League Baseball divisions
1969 establishments in the United States